The Magnificent Miriam Makeba is a 1966 album by Miriam Makeba (LP Mercury 134016). It was her first album after moving from RCA Victor to Mercury.

Track listing
Mr. Man	
Imagine Me	
La Bushe (Congo Bushe)	
Where Are You Going	
Charlie (Oh Mama)	
West Wind	
A Piece Of Ground	
That's How It Goes (Ntsizwa)	
My Love Is Young	
Oh, Tell Me My Mother (Wa Thint'a Madoda)	
I'm In Love With Spring	
Akana Nkomo

References

1966 albums
Miriam Makeba albums
Mercury Records albums